This article lists the largest companies in Sri Lanka terms of their revenue, net profit and total assets, according to the American business magazines Fortune and Forbes and local business magazine LMD.

2022  list 
This list is based on the LMD, which ranks the largest publicly traded companies.

See also 
 List of companies of Sri Lanka
 List of government-owned companies of Sri Lanka
 List of largest public companies in Sri Lanka
 List of Sri Lankan public corporations by market capitalisation

References 

Largest